Moody Osman Chana Nya (born 7 January 1999) is a German-Cameroonian footballer who plays as a centre-back for BSV Schwarz-Weiß Rehden.

Career
Chana began his youth career at Schwarz-Weiß Röllinghausen and SG Wattenscheid, before joining the youth academy of Schalke 04 in 2010. He joined the under-19 team of 1899 Hoffenheim in 2017, and began playing for the club's second team. In 2020, Chana joined third-division club VfB Lübeck. In October 2020, he made an appearance for the club's reserve team in the Schleswig-Holstein-Liga. He made his professional debut for Lübeck in the 3. Liga on 27 February 2021, starting against Hallescher FC before being substituted out in the 72nd minute for Pascal Steinwender. The away match finished as a 2–1 loss for Lübeck.

References

External links
 
 
 
 

1999 births
Living people
People from Leer
Footballers from Lower Saxony
German footballers
Germany youth international footballers
Cameroonian footballers
German people of Cameroonian descent
Association football central defenders
TSG 1899 Hoffenheim II players
VfB Lübeck players
Kickers Offenbach players
BSV Schwarz-Weiß Rehden players
3. Liga players
Regionalliga players